Tony Lowery (born July 13, 1969) is a former American football quarterback who played two seasons in the Arena Football League with the Cleveland Thunderbolts and Las Vegas Sting. He played college football at the University of Wisconsin. He attended Groveport Madison High School in Groveport, Ohio.

References

External links
Just Sports Stats
College stats

Living people
1969 births
Players of American football from Columbus, Ohio
American football quarterbacks
African-American players of American football
Wisconsin Badgers football players
Cleveland Thunderbolts players
Las Vegas Sting players
21st-century African-American people
20th-century African-American sportspeople